The 1971 Missouri Tigers football team was an American football team that represented the University of Missouri in the Big Eight Conference (Big 8) during the 1971 NCAA University Division football season. The team compiled a 1–10 record (0–7 against Big 8 opponents), finished in last place in the Big 8, and was outscored by opponents by a combined total of 260 to 93. 

Al Onofrio was the head coach for the first of seven seasons after Dan Devine took the position of head coach and general manager of the National Football League's Green Bay Packers. 

The team played its home games at Memorial Stadium in Columbia, Missouri.

The 1-10 record set a new mark for futility at Mizzou, matched only by the 1985 team.

The team's statistical leaders included Don Johnson with 360 rushing yards, Chuck Roper with 613 passing yards and 726 yards of total offense, John Henley with 247 receiving yards, and Greg Hill with 23 points scored.

Schedule

References

Missouri
Missouri Tigers football seasons
Missouri Tigers football